The Eight Principles of Yong (eiji happō; , Yeongjapalbeop) explain how to write eight common strokes in regular script which are found all in the one character,  ("forever", "permanence"). It was traditionally believed that the frequent practice of these principles as a beginning calligrapher could ensure beauty in one's writing.

The Eight Principles are influenced by the earlier Seven Powers  by Lady Wei Shuo of Eastern Jin. Publications on the Principles include:
 The Praise to the Eight Principles of "Yong" by Liu Zongyuan of the Tang Dynasty.
 Explanations to the Eight Principles of "Yong" by Li Puguang of the Yuan Dynasty. Lǐ provided two-character metaphorical names.

Table of naming usages 

Note:  － Xié  is sometimes added to the 's strokes. It is a concave Shù falling right, always ended by a Gōu, visible on this image.

CJK strokes

See also 
 CJK characters
 CJK strokes

References 
 Explanations to the Eight Principles of "Yong" by Li Puguang
 Unicode page for all CJK strokes, thus including the 8 strokes of Yong

8 Eight Principles of Yong
Chinese characters
East Asian calligraphy